Corrado Pilat (born 24 September 1974 in Belluno) is a former Italian international rugby union player and a current coach.
He played as a fullback and as a fly-half.

He played professionally for Benetton Treviso, from 1998/99 to 200/01, where he won two Italian Championships, in 1998/99 and 2000/01. He later played for Rugby Parma F.C. 1931 (2001/02-2003/04) and Rugby Bologna 1928 (2004/05).
He moved for one season to Barking, in 2005/06, in the National Division One of England, where he won the Essex Cup. Returning to Italy, Pilat represented Rugby Viadana (2006/07-2007/08), winning the Cup of Italy for 2006/07, Venezia Mestre Rugby FC (2008/09-2009/10) and Montebelluna (2010/11), where he finished his career as a player-coach.

He had 7 caps for Italy, from 1997 to 2001, scoring 2 tries and 1 penalty, 13 points on aggregate. He was called for the 2000 Six Nations Championship and the 2001 Six Nations Championship, this time scoring 1 try and 1 penalty, 8 points on aggregate.

References

External links
Corrado Pilat International Statistics

1974 births
Living people
Italian rugby union players
Italy international rugby union players
Italian rugby union coaches
Benetton Rugby players
Rugby Viadana players
Venezia Mestre Rugby FC players
Rugby union fullbacks
Rugby union fly-halves